Euchristophia is a monotypic moth genus in the family Geometridae described by David Stephen Fletcher in 1979. It contains only one species, Euchristophia cumulata, described by Hugo Theodor Christoph in 1880, which is found in Taiwan, Japan and the Russian Far East.

The wingspan is 21–25 mm.

Subspecies
Euchristophia cumulata cumulata (Japan)
Euchristophia cumulata meridionalis Inoue, 1986 (Taiwan)
Euchristophia cumulata sinobia (Wehrli, 1939)

References

External links

Caberini
Monotypic moth genera
Moths of Asia